Prem Bibhrat is a Bengali romantic comedy film directed by Archan Chakraborty. This film was released on 6 June 2012.

Plot
Kanchan and Nabanita are college friends, they fall in love. Their respective fathers were also college mates having a good relationship. Both the respective fathers get wrong ideas about their respective son or daughter. They assume them to love somebody else due to circumstances. Finally all wrongs impressions are done away and Kanchan marries Nabanita.

Cast
 Prosenjit Chatterjee as Kanchan
 June Malia as Nabanita
 Subhendu Chatterjee
 Manoj Mitra
 Chinmoy Roy
 Nayna Das (Bandopadhyay)

References

External links
 

2012 films
2012 romantic comedy-drama films
Indian romantic comedy-drama films
Bengali-language Indian films
2010s Bengali-language films
2012 comedy films